"When the Boys Come into Town" is a song by European-American pop group The Kelly Family. It was produced by Kathy and Paddy Kelly for their ninth studio album Almost Heaven (1996) and features lead vocals by John, Kathy and Maite Kelly. The song served as the last single from the album.

Track listings

Charts

References

External links
 KellyFamily.de — official site

1996 songs
The Kelly Family songs